Edison Enrique Rijna (born 7 July 1967) is a Dutch politician who is the current Lieutenant Governor of Bonaire. He previously served as the acting Island governor from 1 March 2014 to 22 August 2014. As a child he attended Prinses Beatrix School and SGB High School on Bonaire.

See also
Gerald Berkel, former island governor of Sint Eustatius
Jonathan Johnson, island governor of Saba.
Evelyn Wever-Croes, Prime Minister of Aruba
Gilmar Pisas, Prime Minister of Curacao
Silveria Jacobs, Prime Minister of Sint Maarten

References

1967 births
Living people
Lieutenant Governors of Bonaire